Kandankali is a village in Kerala, India. The village is situated about two kilometers south of the town of Payyanur in Kannur district.

Culture
Kandankali has traditionally been home of progressive movements and many forms of traditional and ritualistic arts like Theyyam, Poorakkali and Kolkali. The population of the village is almost entirely constituted by Hindus who by and large are very secular in their outlook.

Nature
The place is very scenic and is bounded on its east and south side by the beautiful Perumba River.

Temples
The famous Subramanya Swami Temple is near Kandankali. The name Kandankali is formed from 'Kandan' and 'Kali' which means Lord Shiva and Parvathi. The famous Karali Sree Bhadrakali Temple is located at the western border of Kandankali.

Geography and natural resources
This place is best for fish farming and prawn farming. The Perumba and Kunchimangalam Rivers are located in Kandangali. It is also very near to the Ezhimala Naval Academy, where the mountain view from the sea is so beautiful as well as the vision from the mountain to the sea.

Transportation
The national highway passes through Perumba junction. Goa and Mumbai can be accessed on the northern side and Cochin and Thiruvananthapuram can be accessed on the southern side.  The road to the east of Iritty connects to Mysore and Bangalore. The nearest railway station is Payyanur on Mangalore-Palakkad line, from which trains are available to almost all parts of India. There are airports at Kannur, Mangalore and Calicut. All of them are international airports but direct flights are available only to Middle Eastern countries.

References 

Villages near Payyanur